Mansour Lakehal (born 30 December 1983) is a French professional footballer.

Professional career
Attending a tryout for Etoile, an all-French side newly installed in the 2010 S.League, Lakehal landed his first professional contract. He stated that it was not easy to adapt at first due to being away from loved ones, which was made harder by the heat and the language barrier of his new place of work. Scooping up the 2010 S.League and League Cup trophies, the center-back was voted the championship's best defender, nicknamed 'The Rock'. Despite forming a solid back line with fellow center-back Loïc Leclercq, an infuriated Lakehal was reported to have slapped Tampines Rovers' Benoit Croissant in a game as they were held 1-1, ending up having to sit out for three games.

References

External links 
 Foot-Occitane.Com Profile 
 UK Soccerway

French expatriate footballers
Living people
1983 births
Singapore Premier League players
Expatriate footballers in Algeria
Toulouse Rodéo FC players
French footballers
Association football defenders
Expatriate footballers in Singapore
CS Constantine players
French sportspeople of Algerian descent
US Colomiers Football players
AFC Compiègne players
Étoile FC managers